Grundschrift (base font, literally ground script) is a simplified form of handwriting adopted by Hamburg schools, and it is currently endorsed by the German National Primary Schoolteachers' Union.

If nationally adopted, it would replace the three different German cursives currently being taught in schools: the Lateinische Ausgangsschrift (introduced in 1953), the Schulausgangsschrift (1968), and the Vereinfachte Ausgangsschrift (1969), providing a standardized system of handwriting in German school systems.

Grundschrift letters are written separately as block letters as opposed to cursive script, in which letters are conjoined together in a flowing motion.

See also 
 Kurrent
 Sütterlin

References 

Western calligraphy
Penmanship
Writing